Anomphalogaza is a genus of sea snails, marine gastropod mollusks in the family Margaritidae within the superfamily Trochoidea, the top snails, turban snails and their allies.

Species
Species within the genus Anomphalogaza include:
 Anomphalogaza moluccensis Hickman, 2012

References

External links
 To World Register of Marine Species

 
Margaritidae
Monotypic gastropod genera